The Birbir River of southwestern Ethiopia is a tributary of the Baro River, which it creates when it joins the Gebba at latitude and longitude . It is politically important because its course defines part of the boundary between the Mirab Welega and Illubabor Zones of the Oromia Region. Richard Pankhurst notes that the Birbir is economically important for the discovery in 1904 of deposits of platinum along its course.

See also 
 List of rivers of Ethiopia

References

External links 
 Ethiopia Disaster Prevention and Preparedness Agency: Administrative atlas: Oromiya region
 Ethiopia Disaster Prevention and Preparedness Agency: Flood Vulnerable Areas as of August 24, 2006

Rivers of Ethiopia
Ethiopian Highlands
Geography of Oromia Region
Sobat River